Bishop Carroll Catholic High School is a private high school located in Wichita, Kansas, United States. Along with Kapaun Mt. Carmel Catholic High School, it is one of two Catholic high schools in the city, part of the Roman Catholic Diocese of Wichita.

History
Bishop Mark K. Carroll was installed as the bishop of the Roman Catholic Diocese of Wichita on May 6, 1947. From there he began to have a vision.  He wanted to establish the first Catholic boys' high school in the Wichita Diocese.  He immediately began to follow this dream.  By  September 1962, Bishop Mark Carroll had installed two Catholic boys' high schools, Bishop Carroll being the second.  At first, he named the new school Notre Dame High School, but by May 1964, Notre Dame had closed in order for it to be moved to its current location and reopened.   The name was then changed to Bishop Mark K. Carroll High School, and classes began on September 8, 1964.  Then, in 1971, Bishop Carroll High School merged with Madonna High School, an all-girls school founded by the Sisters Adorers of the Blood of Christ and the Congregation of Sisters of St. Joseph.

Extracurricular activities
The Golden Eagles compete in the Greater Wichita Athletic League and are classified as a 5A school, the second-largest classification in Kansas according to the Kansas State High School Activities Association. Throughout its history, Bishop Carroll has won many state championships in various sports. Many graduates have gone on to participate in collegiate athletics.

Academics
Bishop Carroll regularly competes in Debate, Forensics, and Scholar's Bowl. In Scholar's Bowl, Bishop Carroll has won Kansas State High School Activities Association 5A State Championships in 2006, 2007, 2010, and 2014.

Athletics
Bishop Carroll is a member of the Kansas State High School Activities Association and competes in the Greater Wichita Athletic League, which consists of the nine high schools in the city of Wichita.

Fall
 Football
 Volleyball
 Boys Cross-Country
 Girls Cross-Country
 Girls Golf
 Boys Soccer
 Girls Tennis
 Cheerleading
 Dance Team

Winter
 Boys Basketball
 Girls Basketball
 Wrestling
 Boys Bowling
 Girls Bowling
 Winter Cheerleading
 Boys Swimming/Diving
 Winter Dance Team

Spring
 Baseball
 Boys Golf
 Boys Tennis
 Girls Soccer
 Girls Swimming/Diving
 Softball
 Boys Track and Field
 Girls Track and Field

Notable alumni
Blake Bell, NFL player for the Kansas City Chiefs
Mark Bell, former NFL player for the Seattle Seahawks and Baltimore/Indianapolis Colts
Mike Bell, former NFL player for the Kansas City Chiefs

See also
 Education in Kansas
 List of high schools in Kansas

References

External links
 Official school website

Roman Catholic Diocese of Wichita
Catholic secondary schools in Kansas
Schools in Wichita, Kansas
Educational institutions established in 1964
1964 establishments in Kansas